Murum may refer to:

Long Murum, village, Belaga District, Kapit Division, Sarawak, Malaysia
Murum Dam, Sarawak, Malaysia
Murum River, Sarawak, Malaysia, dammed at Murum Dam
Murum (state constituency), represented in the Sarawak State Legislative Assembly
Murum, Osmanabad, Maharashtra, India
Murum Village, Baramati, Pune, Maharashtra, India